The Opposition are the political parties represented in the Assembly of the Union that are not in government either on their own or as part of a governing coalition. The Leader of the Opposition is the leader of the largest political party in the Assembly of the Union that is not in government.

The Leader of the Opposition is often seen as a President-in-Waiting or future Speaker of the Assembly of the Union and Speaker of Pyithu Hluttaw or Speaker of Amyotha Hluttaw.

List of leaders of the opposition since 2011

See also
 Parliamentary opposition
 Loyal opposition
 List of political parties in Burma

References

Burmese democracy movements
Myanmar
Political parties in Myanmar
Myanmar